The fourth season of Top Gear began airing on History from September 3, 2013 until November 26, 2013. Adam Ferrera, Tanner Foust, Rutledge Wood and The Stig returned as hosts, with ten weekly episodes being broadcast.

Production
Ferrara announced on April 30, 2013 that filming for a fourth season had officially begun, and this series later premiered on September 3, 2013.

Episodes

References

External links
 Season 4 at the Internet Movie Database

Top Gear seasons
2013 American television seasons
2013 in American television